Ferit Gümüş (born 1 January 1981) is a Turkish wheelchair basketball player and Paralympian. He is a 3 point player competing for Galatasaray Wheelchair Basketball Team, and is part of Turkey men's national wheelchair basketball team.

Ferit played in the national team, which qualified to the 2012 Summer Paralympics.

Career history
He played in the national team, which ranked eight at the 2010 Wheelchair Basketball World Championship held in Birmingham, United Kingdom .

At the 2012 Summer Paralympics, the national team, he was part of, ranked 7th.

Achievements

References

1981 births
Living people
People from Kızıltepe
Turkish men's wheelchair basketball players
Paralympic wheelchair basketball players of Turkey
Wheelchair basketball players at the 2012 Summer Paralympics
Wheelchair basketball players at the 2016 Summer Paralympics
Wheelchair basketball players at the 2020 Summer Paralympics
Galatasaray S.K. (wheelchair basketball) players
Beşiktaş JK wheelchair basketball players
Forwards (basketball)